Paul Hamilton Wright (born 17 August 1967) is a Scottish retired footballer whose position was striker. Wright played for seven professional clubs spanning 14 years.

Wright is currently assistant manager at Bonnyton Thistle.

Playing career
Born in East Kilbride, South Lanarkshire, Wright's professional career began with Aberdeen in 1983. He won the Scottish Youth Cup as a trainee, alongside David Robertson, Joe Miller and Stevie Gray. However the competition for a striking place at Pittodrie was tough and he was never able to hold down a regular spot in the team, moving on to England and Queens Park Rangers for one season and then returning to Scotland for an equally brief spell with Hibernian.

It was in the mid-to-late 1990s, however, that Wright was at the peak of his career in the Scottish Premier Division, firstly with St Johnstone and then Kilmarnock. He was transferred from Hibs to St Johnstone for £275,000, and from St Johnstone to Kilmarnock for £340,000, becoming both clubs' record buys.

Wright scored the winning goal for Kilmarnock in the 1997 Scottish Cup Final against Falkirk.

He brought his professional playing career to a close in 2002 with Greenock Morton and moved into junior football with Larkhall Thistle.

Coaching career
Wright moved into coaching after retirement and worked as Under-20s manager at Scottish Lowland Football League club BSC Glasgow until June 2017, when he joined his former Kilmarnock coach Alan Robertson at new South of Scotland League side Bonnyton Thistle.

References

External links

Kilmarnock stats at Fitbastats
Profile and stats at AFC Heritage Trust

1967 births
Living people
Sportspeople from East Kilbride
Scottish footballers
Association football forwards
Aberdeen F.C. players
Queens Park Rangers F.C. players
Hibernian F.C. players
St Johnstone F.C. players
Kilmarnock F.C. players
Falkirk F.C. players
Greenock Morton F.C. players
Larkhall Thistle F.C. players
Scottish Football League players
Scottish Premier League players
English Football League players
Scotland B international footballers
Scottish Junior Football Association players
Footballers from South Lanarkshire
Scotland under-21 international footballers